Bordeștii may refer to one of two villages in Romania:

 Bordeștii Poieni, a village in Vidra Commune, Alba County
 Bordeștii de Jos, a village in Bordești Commune, Vrancea County